Miaoulis was a Type III  destroyer that was originally built for the British Royal Navy as HMS Modbury but never commissioned. Before her completion, she was transferred to the Royal Hellenic Navy and commissioned on 25 November 1942 as Miaoulis in order to relieve heavy losses of ships sustained by the Royal Hellenic Navy during the German invasion of 1941. Miaoulis served in the Mediterranean Theatre throughout the Second World War. On 10 October 1943, during the Dodecanese Campaign, she saved the crew of the British destroyer . She served during the Greek Civil War, was returned to the Royal Navy in 1959 and broken up for scrap in 1960.

References

Publications

External links 
RHS Miaoulis (L 91) at UBoat.net

 

Hunt-class destroyers of the Royal Navy
Ships built on the River Tyne
1942 ships
World War II destroyers of the United Kingdom
Hunt-class destroyers of the Hellenic Navy
World War II destroyers of Greece